Ruach Minyan is an independent minyan or chavurah in Washington, D.C., organized entirely by volunteer leadership and affiliated with Adas Israel Congregation.  Its primary activity is Friday night services and dinner.

About 
Ruach Minyan is an egalitarian Kabbalat Shabbat and Ma'ariv service that combines traditional, songful davening with Shabbat dinner.

References

External links 
 Ruach Minyan Community Page

Independent minyanim
Jews and Judaism in Washington, D.C.
Religious buildings and structures in Washington, D.C.
1998 establishments in Washington, D.C.